Claudio Arzeno (born 16 October 1970 in Argentina) is an Argentinean retired footballer. He primarily played for Racing de Santander in Spain. After leaving the playing field, he became a coach.

References

Argentine footballers
Living people
Association football defenders
1970 births
People from Villa María
Club Atlético Independiente footballers
Racing de Santander players
UD Las Palmas players
Chacarita Juniors footballers
Sportspeople from Córdoba Province, Argentina
Doping cases in association football